Marc Millar (born 10 April 1969) is a Scottish former footballer.

Millar played in eight Scottish Premier League games for St Johnstone during the 1999–2000 Scottish Premier League season. Soon after signing for St Johnstone, he scored the winning goal in a Tayside derby against Dundee.

References

External links 

1969 births
Living people
Footballers from Dundee
Scottish footballers
Association football midfielders
Brechin City F.C. players
Dunfermline Athletic F.C. players
Livingston F.C. players
St Johnstone F.C. players
Ross County F.C. players
Raith Rovers F.C. players
Arbroath F.C. players
Cowdenbeath F.C. players
Scottish Football League players
Scottish Premier League players